The Strategic Ocean Force has been the synonym of the French Submarine Forces since 1999, which the commandant commands the ensemble related to, along with the squadron of nuclear attack submarine.

The French Strategic Ocean Force Command ALFOST was set up in 1972 under a Squadron Vice-Admiral.

Generality 

The Strategic Ocean Force, created on March 1 1972, constitutes the principal composite of the Strategic French Nuclear Forces.

FOST has been placed under the command of a Squadron Vice-Admiral  (Officers of Admiral rank), hence the acronym ALFOST. With the dissolution of the Attack Submarine Group of the Atlantic, ultimate formation regrouping submarines with conventional propulsion, on July 1 1999, the strategic force regroups the ensemble of French submarines.

Force de dissuasion 

The Strategic Force was born after the World War II from the will of général de Gaulle to possess a nuclear arm. The French Nuclear Ballistic Missile Submarines armed with Submarine-launched ballistic missiles, in relation to their discretion in the various oceanic patrol zones, ensure a guaranteed retaliatory nuclear strike (second strike). 

Since 1985, the strategy of nuclear deterrence in France armed six French Nuclear Ballistic Missile Submarines in service, five in service since 1991, and four since 1997; maintaining a permanent presence around the Oceans and Seas. 

Deterrence is ensured in 2014 by the permanent deployment of the French Nuclear Ballistic Missile Submarines of the Triomphant-class. 

Between 1972 and April 2014, hundreds of patrols were realized. 

The first submarine class of French Nuclear Ballistic Missile Submarines in service was the Le Redoutable-class, the head of the series, which was put in dry-docks under authorization in March 1963, with construction commencing in 1964 and was launched on March 29 1967 in presence of President of France Charles de Gaulle. Trials of the latter commenced in 1969 and the boat entered into service on December 1 1971.

Six French nuclear ballistic missile submarines of the Le Redoutable class capable of carrying sixteen ballistic missiles were built:
 Le Redoutable (in service 1971-1991)
 Le Terrible (1973-1996) 
 Le Foudroyant (1974-1998)
 L'Indomptable (1976-2003)
 Le Tonnant (1980-1999)
 L'Inflexible (1985-2008)

Four French nuclear ballistic missile submarines of a newer generation, the Le Triomphant class, are in service in 2013 in the force océanique stratégique of the French Navy:

 Le Triomphant (S616)  (entered in service since 1997)
 Le Téméraire (S617)  (entered into service since 1999)
 Le Vigilant (S618)  (entered into service since 2004)
 Le Terrible (S619)  (entered into service since 2010). Le Terrible was presented on March 21 2008, and entered service at the end of September 2010 to replace the L'Inflexible, last of the retrieved Le Redoutable class ballistic missile submarine in 2008.

The armament systems of the ballistic missile submarines include in general:
 16 missiles M45 with TN 75 heads (nuclear deterrence). French Nuclear deterrence also includes M51 missiles.
 4 tubes of 533mm for F17 torpedoes and Exocet SM39 anti-ship missiles.

The mission of a French Nuclear Ballistic Missile Submarine is simple: leave the designated port of attachment, in the most discreet possible way, remain undetectable all along the mission to be able at any moment launch a nuclear strike, under orders of the President of France.

See also 
Chief of Staff of the French Navy
French Navy
French Naval Aviation
List of Escorteurs of the French Navy
List of submarines of France
French Air Force
Strategic Air Forces Command

References

Notes

Bibliographies 
Y.Cariou, FOST Force Océanique Stratégique, Marines Editions, 2007

French naval components
Nuclear weapons program of France